Jake Girdwood-Reich is an Australian professional footballer who plays as a midfielder for Sydney FC. He made his professional debut in an Australia Cup Round of 32 match for Sydney against Central Coast Mariners on 31 July 2022. He made his A-League Men debut for the club as a substitute on 29 October 2022 against Macarthur FC.

Jake won the Sydney FC Rising Star Award at the 2022 Sky Blue Awards night shortly after being promoted to the A-League from the NPL squad.

In his early years as a student at Clovelly Primary School, Jake earned representative honours playing in the NSW Primary School team which won the Australian schoolboys championship, and later the U17 socceroos who won the  Asian Football Confederation, to qualify for the 2021 U17 World Cup in Peru that was cancelled due to COVID 19.

References

External links

Living people
Australian soccer players
Association football midfielders
Sydney FC players
National Premier Leagues players
A-League Men players
2004 births